Zinc finger transcription factor Trps1 is a protein that in humans is encoded by the TRPS1 gene.

This gene encodes a GATA-like transcription factor that represses GATA-regulated genes and binds to a dynein light chain protein. Binding of the encoded protein to the dynein light chain protein affects binding to GATA consensus sequences and suppresses its transcriptional activity. Defects in this gene are a cause of tricho–rhino–phalangeal syndrome (TRPS) types I–III (also known as the Langer–Giedion syndrome).

References

Further reading

External links 
 

Transcription factors